Estádio Municipal Coaracy da Mata Fonseca, also known as Fumeirão, is a stadium in Arapiraca, Brazil. It has a capacity of 17,000 spectators.  It is the home of Agremiação Sportiva Arapiraquense of the Campeonato Brasileiro Série C.

References

Football venues in Alagoas
Sports venues in Alagoas